Thomas Thorstensen (18 May 1880 – 18 June 1953) was a Norwegian gymnast who competed in the 1908 Summer Olympics and in the 1912 Summer Olympics.

As a member of the Norwegian team, he won a silver medal in the gymnastics team event in 1908.

References

External links
profile

1880 births
1953 deaths
Norwegian male artistic gymnasts
Gymnasts at the 1908 Summer Olympics
Gymnasts at the 1912 Summer Olympics
Olympic gymnasts of Norway
Olympic gold medalists for Norway
Olympic silver medalists for Norway
Olympic medalists in gymnastics
Medalists at the 1912 Summer Olympics
Medalists at the 1908 Summer Olympics
20th-century Norwegian people